Andrea Provana or simply Provana was the name of at least two ships of the Italian Navy named in honour of André Provana de Leyni and may refer to:

 , a  launched in 1918 and discarded in 1928.
 , a  launched in 1938 and sunk in 1940.

Italian Navy ship names